Hiking equipment is the equipment taken on outdoor walking trips. Hiking is usually divided into day-hikes and multiple-day hikes, called  backpacking, trekking, and walking tours.

The equipment selected varies according to the duration, distance, planned activities, and the environment. Additional factors include weight and preparedness for unplanned events. The level of preparedness can relate to remoteness and potential hazards; for example, a short day hike across farmland or trekking in the Himalayas. The length and duration of a walk can influence the amount of weight carried.

The nature of a hike is both by the natural environment and the applicable government regulations and hikers plan accordingly when considering equipment. To minimize the impact on the natural environment, many hikers follow the principles of "Leave No Trace".

Planning and checklists 

According to Tom Brown, the basic plan for survival  is in the order of shelter (including clothing), water, fire, and food. Cody Lundin writes about the "Rule of 3s"; this relates to human survival without basics: three minutes without air, three hours without shelter, three days without water, or three weeks without food.

Hikers may take with them equipment ranging from a stout knife to ultralight backpacking (10–25 pounds), to the heaviest, most durable gear a hiker can carry. Checklists help to minimize the chance of forgetting something important.

Considerations for choice of hiking equipment may include:

 Length and remoteness of trip
 Optimal weight and capacity
 Special medical considerations
 Weather: temperature range, sun/shade, rain, snow, ice
 Terrain: trail conditions, cliffs, sand, swamp, river crossings
 Shelter and clothes
 Water plan
 Food
 Overnight shelter
 Protection from animals: insect repellent, anaphylactic medication,  snakebite first-aid, antivenom, mace, bear spray, bear-resistant food storage container
 Equipment for special activities

Carrying methods and capacity

A pack's capacity to carry items is determined by:
 Carrying methods on the body
 Bag volume
 Construction strength, design, materials, and construction quality

Commonly-used carrying methods include:
 A wristband, belt loop, a thin neck lanyard, and clothing pockets are among the smaller, lighter methods. 
 A small belt pouch (60 cu.in., 1 liter) that can attach to a belt 
 A bodypack or tactical vest (100–200 cu.in.) is a load-bearing vest, and may be as simple as a fishing vest.
 A single-shoulder pack (500–800 cu.in., 8-14L) uses one shoulder strap, such as a haversack,  messenger bag, or sling bag. 
 A waistpack can range in size from a belt pouch to a haversack (1-14L); in the larger sizes, shoulder straps maybe provided. Waistpacks may be carried over a shoulder.
 Day packs (1,000–2,000 cu.in., 17-34L) are small to mid-sized backpacks that have two shoulder straps, smaller ones may not include a waist belt.
 A harness system may include a small backpack, a waistpack, a vest, and several belt pouches.
 Larger cargo backpacks (6,000 cu.in, 100+L) that have substantial, well-padded shoulder straps and a waist belt; some of these are designed to carry a couple of hundred pounds.

Some hikers divide their backpack into sections associated with specific needs, i.e. kitchen, bedroom, bathroom, etc., or by clothes, shelter, water, fire, and food. Military and law-enforcement personnel use a variety of modular and attachment systems, like duty belts, tactical vests, All-purpose Lightweight Individual Carrying Equipment, MOLLE, Improved Load Bearing Equipment, FILBE, and PLCE. Military surplus outlets are optional sources for backpacking equipment.

Construction quality may be determined by design, manufacturer reputation, advertised purpose, and field testing. Customer reviews are often posted online. Heavy pack fabrics are made from 800–1000 denier nylon material.

The best-made packs may carry up to twice their weight in water; less well-made packs may only carry half their weight in water. Backpacks carrying more than  usually have waist-belts to help with posture by transferring the weight to the hips. Some experts recommend keeping the equipment's total weight to less than 25% of the hiker's weight.

Apparel

Apparel, including clothing, jackets, shoes, hats, etc., provides insulation from heat, cold, water or fire. It shades the body and protects it from injury from thorns, insect bites, blisters and UV.

Basic outdoor clothing materials are goose down, wool, polyester, and polyolefin, which provide similar degrees of insulation when dry. Wool and polyesters perform reasonably well for most weather conditions and provide some insulation while wet. Cotton/linen wicks moisture, good for hot/humid weather. Cotton, linen and down lose insulation when wet unless they are treated to be water-resistant.

Natural fabrics, such as cotton, linen and wool have higher burn temperatures, and they char instead of melting when exposed to flame. When a fabric melts onto skin it is difficult to remove, unlike a material that chars. Nomex is used for fire-resistant clothing. Wool is a good all-around fabric. Cotton and linen are best for hot weather and worst for cold, wet weather. Synthetics can be about the same as wool in the winter; many of them are fire hazards. Fabrics can be treated to help reduce their disadvantages.

Down is the lightest  thermal-insulating material and compresses the most. Synthetics are next best. Wool is heavier than down and synthetics, and does not compress well. Stuff sacks and compression sacks are used for carrying insulated clothing and sleeping bags. Layered clothing allows for fine tuning of body temperature. The inner-base layer should wick away moisture. The mid-layer is used for the appropriate insulation, and the outer-shell layer provides wind and rain protection.
 
For long trips, having enough clothes to change into is helpful, while washing or drying others. An extra pair of socks can be used as mittens. Shorts for swimming and fording streams are also useful. Wet clothes do not insulate as well and can freeze while a hiker is wearing them. If a hiker falls into ice water, an immediate dry change of clothes from a dry bag can be lifesaving. Layered clothing helps regulate body temperature in varying weather conditions.

Gloves provide protection from blisters, abrasions, cold and hot objects, and insects. General purpose gloves are a thin glove-liners — wool may be preferred around campfires — combined with a pair of leather gloves. Glove liners often provide enough dexterity while not fully exposing the hands to freezing conditions. Shoes with traction reduce the chance of slipping, causing an injury or death. Shoes that support the ankle may also prevent injury. Well-constructed, breathable, waterproof hiking boots are general-purpose hiking shoes. Mountaineering boots provide more specialized protection. Trainers, sandals, or moccasins are useful for easy walks and may be taken on extended hikes as backup, and to wear when fording streams and in the evening around camp. Waterproof gaiters are used in cold or wet conditions to protect the lower pants and upper part of the shoes, and reduce the amount of water, snow, and debris from entering boots and soaking into other fabrics. Brush chaps or pants for thick brush or thorns, and snake chaps or gaiters help protect the legs from snake bites.

Hot-wet-weather clothing

 Long-sleeved shirt and long pants provide sun and insect protection, and help to reduce abrasions when plowing through brush and when slipping and falling on rocks.
 Sun hat
 Bug jackets and head-nets provide insect protection and are especially useful if the insect repellent is either not effective or runs out. These are a couple items that hikers may use to minimize the use of insect repellent on their skin.
 Rain clothing made from waterproof or water-resistant fabrics, and preferably breathable, like Gore-Tex:
 Raincoat
 Rain pants and/or rain skirt (useful in hotter climates)
 Rain poncho, uses: tarpaulin, ground cloth, backpack cover, hammock, stretcher
 Plastic bags made into a poncho and a rain skirt
 Gloves and socks. Latex (petroleum degrades them) or Nitrile gloves (medical grade is the top grade)
 Plastic bags put on over socks then inserted into shoes
 Jungle footwear: vented boots to drain water, the best wicking socks possible, sandals with good walking straps or jungle moccasins

Snow-ice-cold clothing
High-altitude hikers encounter freezing conditions, even in summer, and there are also permanent glaciers and snowfields.

 Parka, insulated coat extending below the waist, are often hooded
 Snow pants: insulated, water-wind-resistant
 Long underwear
 Balaclavas are versatile, because they can protect the head, neck and face from the cold. 
 Insulated face mask to provide a solid wind barrier for extreme cold that is beyond a balaclava.
 Scarves are equally versatile and may be combined with knit hats for the same effect as a balaclava.
 Gloves: insulated, breathable, and water-resistant. Mittens for the more extreme cold temperatures, but they offer less dexterity. Glove liners used with mittens provide more dexterity without fully exposing the hands to the elements.
 Snow boots, mukluks, bunny boots

Shelter

Overnight shelter

An overnight shelter may be as simple as a wool blanket and tarp, or a complete sleep-system inside a double-walled, four-season tent. Sleeping layers may be layered the same way as clothing layers: inner, mid, and outer shell. Bedding options range from a pillow made from clothes to a sleep system comprising sleeping pad, sleeping bag, bivouac shelter, bag liner, and compression sack. Shelter structures can be constructed from a tarpaulin, ground sheet, rope, poles, or trees, with a mosquito net. Rain poncho may be used as a ground sheet, or used as an overhead tarp, or rigged as a hammock. Tent hammocks comes with a bug net and overhead tarp. A cave, bivouac shelter, or debris shelter can also be used. Jungle shelters are used in jungles and tropical rainforest, where rainfall, mud, invertebrates, and snakes are common. A Venezuelan or jungle hammock is well ventilated, with a bug net and a covering tarpaulin. A platform can be built off the ground or tied into a tree. Trekking poles can be used to construct a shelter; they can be used as poles for a tarpaulin. Some tents are designed to use trekking poles in place of carrying additional poles, a technique common in ultralight backpacking.

Continuous clothing-sleeping layers
The line can blur or shift between clothing, bedding, and structural shelter. A rain-poncho and its thermal liner (or a regular poncho) is an example of equipment that can be clothing, bedding, and structural shelter. Ultralight backpackers use typical cold-weather clothes to extend the temperature ranges of their sleeping bags. Then this reasoning can extend to packing a winter coat and snow pants with a bivy bag before adding a two-pound sleeping bag. Adding an insulated pair of socks or down booties would complete the insulation layer.

Given an unexpected turn toward cold weather, bedding can be converted to mobile insulation, but if the pack already contains those items, then time and energy are saved.

Basic equipment and abilities
The most basic hiking equipment is a stout knife, a pot, cordage, a few ways to make a fire, and equipment to carry water and other gear.

 Bandana, uses: a hat, dust mask, face scarf, water filter, first-aid, signal, etc.; larger versions like a shawl, sarong
 Cutting, chopping, and sawing: knife, multi-tool, tomahawk, hatchet, axe, bucksaw, snow knife or snow saw
 Container (see below)
 Cordage (see below)
 Digging: sharp stick, stout knife, trowel, ice axe, entrenching tool (folding shovel), compact shovel, snow shovel
 Fire (see below)
 Light:
 Flashlight (UK torch) or two, preferably hands-free (headband or headlamp), spare batteries and bulb.
 Candle from wax or tallow, or an oil lamp
 Fire and a wood torch
 Medical: first-aid kit, medicines, medicinal plants, cloth, cordage, superglue, Nitrile gloves
Avoiding the need for medical treatment is preferable when possible by learning about nature, water treatment, food poisoning, poisonous plants and animals, and survival skills to avoid things like frostbite.
 Sun protection:
 Clothing: long-sleeved shirt and pants, hat with a full brim or used with a bandana, thin gloves
 Sunglasses: year-round protection from blowing sand/snow, sharp objects, glare, and snow blindness. A band of cloth (bandana) or bark can be used to fashion a pair of emergency sunshades by cutting narrow slits in them. They are critical at high altitude.
 Sunscreen protects from some rays
 Lip balm
 Information: Having information includes being aware of the surroundings and events that may be relevant to the hiker. This starts by being able to navigate. Another part is the weather, being able to read the weather, having gathered the latest and longer predictions before a hike, and possibly having a weather radio for updates. Being able to see further (binoculars) and record what is seen maybe additional equipment in this area.
 Navigate by reference, terrain, global positioning system (GPS), and by map and compass.
 Swimming goes with the first Rule of 3: air. If a hiker is swept off his or her feet into deep water, or falls into a lake, then swimming moves to the top of the list.
 Trekking poles or hiking sticks are important for stability and balance. The key features of trekking poles that are important are weight, adjustability, shock absorption, locking mechanisms.

Water kit

Water needs to be drinkable. Hikers usually carry some, but do not carry all that they need, because it weighs one kilogram (2.2 lbs) per liter, and hikers can consume 2-4+ liters per day (4–9 lbs). Additional water usually can be located, collected, filtered, and purified. All water in the wild is potentially unclean.

The details of locating water are beyond the scope of this article. The basics are using a map, knowing how water flows through and collects in certain geographical formations (natural cisterns), and identifying which plants indicate shallow-underground water and contain easily accessed water. Heading downhill to streams, and looking for rich, green vegetation that may indicate a spring, are ways to start. Following bees and tracking animals to cisterns, knowing where to dig in apparent dry stream beds, and possibly waiting for night when vegetation releases water, are slightly more advanced techniques. Water can be collected in a clean container. Clear plastic bags can be used to make vegetation and solar stills. Dehydrated, chemical-free sponges can be used to wipe dew from vegetation, or tied to ankles before one walks through damp vegetation in the morning, soaking up water from wet rocks or sand. A flexible drinking straw can access water in a rock crack, or drink from a water still without opening it. Tarpaulins can also be used to collect rain water or dew.

To remove larger impurities, water can be filtered through grass, sand, charcoal or cloth, such as a bandana or pantyhose. Pantyhose can also be used as an emergency fishing net. Filtering water of larger impurities is a useful way to extend the life of commercial filters, preventing them from getting clogged quickly.

Water must be purified of harmful living organisms and chemicals. Some commercial filters can remove most organisms and some harmful chemicals, but they are not 100% effective. Distillation filters, purifies, and removes some harmful chemicals. Chemicals with a lower or about equal boiling point of water are not eliminated by distilling. Iodine or chlorine dioxide solutions or tablets can be used to purify water. It can be boil water in a fire-resistant pot or water bottle. Water can be boiled in some flammable materials like bark because the water absorbs the heat. Pasteurization takes place at temperatures lower than boiling point, but knowing the temperature of the water and calculating the duration of treatment can be difficult. This technique is useful when only non-durable containers are available. Sunlight can be used with a clear container. Filters made from heat-treated diatomaceous earth can also be used.

Transporting water
A wide-mouth, metal water bottle or a metal pot or cup can also be used to boil and transport water, and can be used fairly easily for cooking. A lid for the pot will help water to boil sooner, helps with cooking by requiring less fuel, and reduces water loss. Other containers for transporting water include appropriate plastic water bottles in materials like Nalgene. There are hard plastic bottles, and soft-collapsible bottles. A hydration pack tube freezes easily. A non-lubricated condom can hold up to two liters, but is very vulnerable to puncture. Placing a stick in the knot will allow it to be re-used. Breast milk bags are plastic bags that double-Ziploc, so they are easier to reseal than a condom and they do not puncture as easily. They are transparent, allowing solar purification and can be used as a magnifying lens to start a fire. Containers that may freeze with water in them may allow for 10% expansion; they may be filled to 90%. Oral rehydration therapy packets can be added to water to help replace electrolytes.

Fire kit

Fire needs ignition, oxygen, and fuel, and the ability to be extinguish. Ignition can come from a spark, a chemical reaction, electricity, or concentrated solar energy. The more oxygen involved, the easier the fire starts and the hotter it burns. Organic material must either be dry or the fire must be hot enough to dry it and burn it. Fraying organic material is more combustible as a tinder. Grain dust and granulated sugar can ignite when oxygenated over a flame.

Sources of ignition include flint, carbon steel, firesteel and a sharp edge, matches, butane and Zippo, and peanut lighters, and magnifying glasses.
Fuels include natural substances like dry wood, peat and coal. pitch, petroleum jelly, charred cotton, shaved rubber, and frayed synthetic cloth can be used as kindling. Candles provide illumination and can help start a fire. Alcohol, DIY and commercial alcohol stoves are made and carried by hikers. Oil, petroleum, vegetable, and tallow can help start and feed a fire. Propane bottles are made for backpacking. Charcoal or briquettes could be packed in the fire.

Sure fire is a way to start a fire in bad conditions or when a hiker has no man-made equipment, like when the fuel is wet, or the lighter has run out of fuel. Some hikers will carry tinder in a few forms, such as a few cotton balls soaked in pure petroleum jelly, fat wood (pitch). Alcohol-wipes and alcohol-hand-sanitizers are other options. Vegetable oils, and some fruit oils, like olive oil, coconut oil, corn chips, or nuts are edible and can be used to help start a fire because of the oil in them. "Bad" conditions also includes high altitude because of less oxygen, high winds blowing out a fire, high humidity that soaks either the fuel source or the igniter.

To extinguish a campfire, see extinguishing a campfire. Knowing ways to survive a wildfire may also be helpful.

Cordage

Cordage provides the abilities to bind, build, repair, and prevent damage. It comes in many sizes and materials, and can be used for building shelters and traps, flossing teeth, fishing, repairing and making clothes, replacing shoelaces, gluing or taping things together. Many cordages are made from natural materials. Some types of cordage are:
 Parachute cord is flexible; its inner threads can be easily pulled out to make longer cordage, or used as threads for sewing or fishing.
 Sewing and suturing thread, dental floss, fishing line, bank line, string, twine, clothes line.
 Wire, such as tripwire or snare wire, has many uses.
 Lanyards, straps, belts, bungee cords
 Tape: medical tape, duct tape, gaffer tape
 Elastic/rubber bands (slingshot), condoms for a slingshot
 Climbing rope for shelters, cliffs, and scrambling
 Superglue

Containers

There are a variety of containers for organizing and keeping equipment dry:
 Clear, plastic Ziploc freezer bags in quart and gallon sizes can be used for emergency water purification and transportation. When filled with equipment and clothes, they become inflated and may help with emergency flotation. 
 Dry bags are heavier, more durable, and provide the same benefits. A dry-bag can be used as an emergency container for boiling water using the hot-rock method. 
 Stuff sacks and compression sacks help reduce the volume of clothes and sleeping bags. 
 Hard-sided, plastic containers that seal using an O-ring may be used to carry critical or expensive equipment, such as electronics, and for the kit that holds the main pocket items.

Food 

Military ready meals provide a wide range of food options for hikers; they tend to be higher in fat and salt than is appropriate for sedentary people. The meals are not dehydrated, and are not intended for more than a few days of hiking. Most of them are not designed to minimize the space they take in a pack.

In addition to a food's expiration date, the main considerations for hiking food are water content, caloric density (more energy per pound for a given space), and nutritional density (more nutrition per pound for a given space). Water weighs , so a  food container can weigh up to  less when it contains dehydrated food. Dehydrating foods can reduce weight and may reduce nutrition while increasing the need for water to reconstitute the food. More weight also expends more energy, so packing lighter foods reduces the need for more calories. Calories equate to energy. Nutrition becomes more important as the number of hiking days increases; for example, MREs are not intended to be used beyond ten days. Multi-vitamins may help offset some nutrition deficiencies.

The three macronutrients are fats (lipids), carbohydrates (sugars and starches), and protein. Fats are calorie dense and nutritionally important, nuts are a good example. Carbohydrates (starches and sugars) that release energy slowly (as measure by glycemic index and glycemic load or the insulin index) give sustained energy, such as legumes and whole grains. Some sources of protein are meats, dairy products, fish, eggs, whole grains, pulses, legumes, and nuts. These are the reasons that "trail" mix usually has dried fruit and a variety of nuts. Nuts and dried fruit can last a long time based on their expiration date. The USDA's page on expiration dates is available online.

Not all food needs to be dehydrated or dried. When a hiker plans to carry a couple liters of water, that is 4.4 pounds of water weight that can be carried in fresh fruits and vegetables for the first day. The same is true for other foods based on their water-weight. Depending on which ones are chosen, this can eliminate or reduce the need for cooking, and the reconstitution time. One of the first meals on a hike could be a Greek salad with a fruit cocktail, followed later with refried beans and tortillas. Nut-butter and honey sandwiches on flatbread can last longer depending on the preservatives in the bread and nut-butter. The same is true for canned goods, most of the weight is in the water. Selecting a canned food is the same: calorie and nutritional dense. Using this can put a hiker down the trail a day or two with little difference in the foods normally eaten.

Taking foods that do not require cooking provides for higher mobility (not stopping to cook), and allows for the contingencies of not having a fire, the cook stove breaking, or running out of fuel. In general, the foods in a grocery store that are not in the refrigerated-freezer sections, are available for the trail.

No-bake home-made "energy" protein bars may contain oatmeal, ground flaxseed, arrowroot powder (medicinal uses), peanut butter, powdered nuts, chopped nuts, coconut oil (multi-use), coconut flakes, dried fruit, cinnamon (medicinal), cooked beans, and natural sweeteners, like honey; they may also be baked. Baked versions may contain natural sweeteners like bananas, applesauce, grated carrots and zucchini.  Either way, they and the no-bake ingredients may be used for the trail.

Flavor enhancers: salt, spices, salt substitute, powdered peppers, dried herbs, powdered bullion or cubes, and hot sauce. 

If food supplies run out, a field guide to edible, medicinal, and poisonous plants may be useful. Or a hiker could study them ahead of time. As the movie "Into the Wild" brought out, some poisonous plants look like edible plants. He had a field guide with him but did not notice the details well enough.

Refrigeration
Water and food can be cooled in snow. Evaporation causes cooling and is used in the pot-in-pot refrigerator. Placing green grass or a sponge into a hat and soaking it with water is another technique. Bottled water can be cooled in a stream.

Cooking

Ultralight backpackers rely only on food that does not need cooking, and reconstitute dehydrated, pre-cooked food without cooking it. A hot drink or meal may help someone with a lower body temperature or help boost morale. In an emergency, most locations would supply material for a fire, as long as there was a container that could withstand the heat. Some options and tradeoffs for choosing equipment.

Cooking options
Cooking options may range from a candle to a bonfire, and may include a solar oven, or a Fresnel lens, or more typical tools and other options:

 Alcohol stove
 Beverage can stove
 Billycan
 Campfire
 Cooking in tinfoil pockets
 Cooking with green-sticks
 Steaming food in appropriate green leaves
 Using a metal grill
 Using thin rocks as a skillet
 Cook stove
 Hobo stove
 Portable stove
 Rocket stove
 Shichirin

Common utensils: knife, fork, spoon, and spork. A butter knife may not be an optimal weight item considering that other knives may be available, or at least it may be sharpened. Utensils may be carved from wood. A fork spears food, so can a sharp stick or a knife. Sporks trade off the volume of the spoon with the ability to spear food. A mid-sized, sturdy metal spoon may be used for cooking, eating, and digging. Even if not cooking, utensils can be useful as tools.
 Mess kit or cookset is a nested set, usually containing a pot with a lid, some times the lid doubles is a frying pan or plate, a bowl, and possibly a cup.
 Towel, bandana, or cotton T-shirt
 Biodegradable soap, or natural cleansers like baking soda, vinegar, pure lemon crystals

Personal hygiene
Equipment not already in the kitchen.
 Dental hygiene: toothbrush (may be sharpened for a marlin spike for rope work), etc.
 Feminine hygiene that doubles as first-aid and tinder: tampons, pads
 Toilet paper (tinder), wet wipes (surefire)
 Tweezers, in a kit, in a multi-tool, on a keyring

Electronics

Handheld-waterproof electronics (or stored in waterproof bags) with spare batteries for critical gear. Some devices come with different power options: solar, hand-crank, and/or USB. And then there are portable solar-charging systems. Depending on electronics to work in life-and-death situations means that the hiker's life is at risk when the equipment fails.
 AM-news-weather radio
 Camera, extra film/memory card
 Cell phone
 Personal-locator beacon or other emergency locator beacon, especially important in possible avalanche areas
 Emergency-channel scanner
 Flashlight, a red filter saves night vision, but reduces sight distance and signalling; carry a spare bulb.
 Global Positioning System (GPS), a lightweight yet rugged and waterproof model with a long battery life, memory for topographical maps, base map ability (so a hiker can drive to the trail) plus the ability to store notes. These are not to be used as a primary navigation tool (as some of their instructions read), but when a hiker can only see a few feet, a GPS can help. If conditions are that bad, then recreational hikers may use it to head toward shelter, versus using it to get into worse conditions, farther from help, and risk having it fail.
 Laser pointer for signaling but can cause eye damage
 Strobe light
 VHF radio: emergency airband-aircraft communication, amateur/ham radio, FM radio (news), marine-band radio for talking to ships
 Walkie talkie or citizens band radio
 UV water purifier: purifies water using laser-UV light, may double as a flashlight

Additional equipment 
 Binoculars, monocular
 Deep snow:  trekking poles with baskets or ski poles, snowshoes, cross-country skies, snow shovel, snow saw
 Ice: Traction cleats with anti-slip soles, crampons, caulk (cork) boots
 Jungle: machete, hammock, extra tinder and insect repellent
 Notepad and writing implements for leaving notes, making notes, drawing, journaling 
 Rain-proof cover for backpack
 Sewing kit: scissors can be in the multi-tool, a place to store the threaded needles, dental floss and fishing line may double as thread, Kevlar thread, safety pins for repair and fishing hooks, replacements for critical buttons or fasteners.
 Umbrella: useful for hiking in the rain or sunshine,; it may be used to help build a small structure
 Walking stability and uphill effort: a walking stick or two, trekking poles, ski poles
 Waterproofing supplies
 Water bottle parka to either delay freezing or when wet, provide cooling
 Wild food when legal or appropriate: field-guide to plants, trapping-hunting kit: traps, scent lures, hunting weapon, slingshot.

Example checklists
Checklists may be compiled from multiple sources, and then tailored to fit a hiker's preferences, and adjusted for specific hikes.
 Wrist, optional: watch, parachute cord, fishing line, compass, altimeter, mini-versions of survival items
 Neck-lanyard, optional: neck knife, mini-flashlight, firesteel, lighter
 Keyring kit: pocket compass, whistle, P-38 can opener (backup blade), optional: keyring knife or multi-tool, mini-flashlight, small firesteel 
 Pockets: keyring kit, lighters and firesteel, folding knife with sharpener or multi-tool with a metal file, bandana, map, cordage, optional electronics
 Cargo-pocket kits or belt-pouch kits in waterproof bags: pocket items, fire kit, two large-clear-plastic bags:
 Water: water purification, non-lubed condoms, large oven bag 
 Cordage: parachute cord, thin-wire spool, large-threaded sewing needles, dental floss, duct tape
 Navigation & signalling: fire, second compass, signal mirror (heliograph), small flashlight with headband or headlamp with spare batteries
 Other: lip balm, Nitrile gloves, earplugs (can be used as fishing bobbers), mini-first-aid kit, superglue, toilet pager
 Food: compact-high-energy food, healthy sweetener, salts and baking soda (rehydration etc.), mini-emergency-fishing kit
 Optional: small containers of sunscreen and insect repellent, binocular/monocular, electronics.
 Belt: belt-pouch kits, optional: larger cutting tools, water container, sunglass case with glasses, earplugs, etc.; electronics. Belt-knife sheath may include a sharpener, a firesteel, etc. Either the belt-items are worn, or they are included in the waistpack.
 Waistpack (or haversack) in waterproof containers: previous kits, large-clear plastic bags, wide-mouth-metal water-bottle, space-blanket or bag, bandanas, hats, gloves, scarf, socks, light-weight-wind-rain layer, thin-long base layer, swim-hiking shorts, high-energy-ready-to-eat food, emergency trapping kit, optional electronics
 Small-to-mid-sized backpack: previous kits, larger cutting-chopping-sawing tools, more water containers (most collapsible for flexibility), mid-weight clothing layer, bivy bag, cooking pot with food kit, personal-hygiene kit, optional: hydration bag, cold-weather coat and pants. The light-weight-rain layer may be replaced with a heavier outer layer.
 Mid-to-large backpack: previous kits, sleep-system, regular-overnight shelter, snow clothing and equipment, additional food and water, optional: large bucksaw or camp-axe

Possible hazards
The possible hazards of hiking may affect equipment choices and decisions about which skills are important to learn. Hazards encountered by hikers include:
 
 Alligators
 Altitude sickness
 Avalanche
 Bears
 Cattle
 Cliffs
 Dehydration 
 Drowning
 Exsanguination 
 Exposure (heights)
 Flash floods
 Hyperthermia 
 Hypothermia 
 Lightning
 Malaria
 Moose
 Poisonous animals
 Poisonous plants
 Starvation
 Swamps
 Ticks
 Weather
 Whitewater
 Wilderness diarrhea
 Wildfires

See also
 Camping equipment
 Outdoor education
 Rock-climbing equipment
 Scout Outdoor Essentials
 Search and rescue
 Survival kit
 Mini survival kits
 Survival skills
 Ten Essentials

Related activities

 Adventure travel
 Camping
 Canoeing
 Cross-country skiing
 Dog hiking
 Fishing
 Hammock camping
 Hillwalking
 Hunting
 Jungle tourism
 Llama hiking
 Mountain biking
 Mountaineering
 Nordic Walking
 Orienteering
 Rafting
 Rock climbing
 Scrambling
 Snowshoeing
 Swimhiking
 Thru-hiking
 Travel backpacking
 Travel writing
 Walking tour
 Wilderness backpacking or trekking

References

Bibliography

 Brown, Tom (April 15, 1987). Tom Brown's Field Guide to Wilderness Survival. Berkley Trade. .
 Canterbury, Dave. Survivability for the Common Man, The Pathfinder System. Amazon Digital Services, Inc. ASIN B007JY1Q6M
 Cole, George; Jordan, Ryan; Dixon, Alan (2006). Lightweight Backpacking and Camping. Bozeman, MT: Beartooth Mountain Press. .
 Gonzales, Laurence (2004). Deep Survival: Who Lives, Who Dies, and Why. W. W. Norton & Company. .
 Hatt, John. (1983) The Tropical Traveller, The Essential Guide to Travel in Hot Countries 
 Jardine, Ray (1999). Beyond Backpacking: Ray Jardines Guide to Lightweight Hiking. LaPine, OR: AventureLore Press. .
 Jasper, George W.. Six Ways In And Twelve Ways Out, a SERE manual, US Rescue and Special Operations Group, Manual.
 Lundin, Cody (June 23, 2003). 98.6 Degrees: The Art of Keeping Your Ass Alive. Gibbs Smith. .
 Manning, Harvey. Backpacking – One step at a time 

 
Survival equipment